The High Commissioner of Australia to Malaysia is an officer of the Australian Department of Foreign Affairs and Trade and the head of the High Commission of the Commonwealth of Australia to Malaysia in Kuala Lumpur. The position has the rank and status of an Ambassador Extraordinary and Plenipotentiary and is currently held by Dr Justin Lee since 1 July 2021.

Posting history
On 11 November 1955, the Minister for External Affairs, Richard Casey, announced that Tom Critchley had been appointed to the newly created position of Australian Commissioner to Malaya in Kuala Lumpur, noting that while "relations with the authorities in the Federation of Malaya had been conducted through the Australian Commissioner in South-East Asia, Sir Alan Watt, ... the Australian Government believed that it was appropriate for Australia to have a full-time representative in Kuala Lumpur in the Federation of Malaya as important constitutional developments were carrying the Federation of Malaya to self-government."

Australia was one of 15 countries to establish formal diplomatic relations with the Federation of Malaya in 1957 soon after independence, with the Australian Commissioner to Malaya appointed High Commissioner from 31 August 1957. With the formation of the Federation of Malaysia on 16 September 1963, the Australian High Commissioner to Malaya in Kuala Lumpur became a High Commissioner, with the Australian Commissioner for Singapore, Brunei, Sarawak, and North Borneo resident in Singapore becoming a subordinate Deputy High Commission until it was replaced by a High Commissioner to an independent Singapore from 9 August 1965.

In 1973, as part of an effort to showcase Australian design in overseas diplomatic missions, the Commonwealth Government of Gough Whitlam commissioned Joyce Nankivell Associates, architects of Melbourne, to design the new High Commission chancery at 6 Jalan Yap Kwan Seng, Kampung Baru, Kuala Lumpur. 
Designed in a bold Brutalist style with an L-shape plan by Bernard Joyce and William Nankivell in association with local architects Leong Thian & Rakan-rakan, on 29 January 1974 Prime Minister Whitlam turned the first sod at the construction site during an official visit to Malaysia, and the completed building was officially opened on 12 June 1978.

On 30 July 1979, the Australian High Commissioner to Malaysia was appointed as the non-resident Commissioner to Brunei, with a stated purpose to "facilitate contacts and closer cooperation with the Government of Brunei during the period leading up to Brunei's full independence in 1983". A resident Australian Commission in Brunei was established in March 1983 in anticipation of Brunei's independence on 1 January 1984.

Heads of mission

Notes
 Commissioner to Malaya until 31 August 1957; High Commissioner to Malaya until 16 September 1963.
 Also non-resident Commissioner to Brunei, 1979–1983.

See also
Australia–Malaysia relations

References

External links

Australian High Commission, Malaysia

 
 
Malaysia
Australia